Kurt Keola Gouveia (born September 14, 1964) is an American football coach and former linebacker who played 13 seasons in the National Football League and one season in the XFL.  During his career, he played for the Washington Redskins (1986–1994; 1999), the Philadelphia Eagles (1995), and the San Diego Chargers (1996–1998). In 2001, he also played for the Las Vegas Outlaws in the now-defunct XFL.

Playing career
Gouveia played college football for Brigham Young University and was a member of their 1984 National Championship team. Gouveia was also a member of the Hawaii State Football Championship Team, Wai'anae High School, 1980.  Gouvia played for BYU from 1983-1985, recording 224 tackles, 10 sacks, and 2 interceptions.

He was selected by the Redskins in the eighth round of the 1986 NFL Draft.  Gouveia sustained a knee injury in training camp as a rookie and did not play during the 1986 NFL season.

In his 13 NFL seasons, Gouveia played in 184 games and his career totals include 73 starts in 151 regular season games, 819 tackles, ten interceptions, eight forced fumbles and two fumble recoveries.

Gouveia played a  majority of his NFL career with the Redskins and was a member of both their 1987 and 1991 Super Bowl Championship teams. During the 1991 postseason, he made an interception in each Redskins' three playoff wins (including one in Super Bowl XXVI). He had only intercepted two passes in his career prior to that.

Coaching career
After his retirement as a player, Gouveia coached linebackers at the professional level as the linebackers coach for the Sacramento Mountain Lions of the United Football League.

He later became the linebackers coach and defensive coordinator at Brevard College (NCAA Division III, Brevard, NC).

Gouveia was added to the coaching staff at Hawaii in 2014, serving as the team's linebackers coach for the season. He was moved to outside linebackers in 2015 following the hire of defensive coordinator Tom Mason, who coached the inside linebackers. He was re-named the linebackers coach for the final game of the 2015 season after Mason was assigned to an administrative role.

In 2019, he was named linebackers coach for the DC Defenders of the XFL.

Personal life
Gouveia's son Jeron Gouveia-Winslow played football at Virginia Tech and was the safeties coach and co-special teams coordinator at Brevard College from 2017-2019 and is currently the Virginia Tech Assistant Director of Player Personnel.

Gouveia is of Portuguese and Hawaiian descent. Kurt is married to Julie Anne Gouveia, and they have a 20-year-old son Dalton Olamana-Gouveia; Dalton played linebacker for the University of Hawaii.

References

External links
Hawaii Sports Hall of Fame Profile
Las Vegas Outlaws Bio

1964 births
Living people
American football linebackers
American people of Portuguese descent
BYU Cougars football players
Washington Redskins players
Philadelphia Eagles players
San Diego Chargers players
Las Vegas Outlaws (XFL) players
Berlin Thunder coaches
DC Defenders coaches
Rhein Fire coaches
Sacramento Mountain Lions coaches
Players of American football from Honolulu
Sportspeople from Honolulu
Hawaii Rainbow Warriors football coaches
Ed Block Courage Award recipients